Frazer Toms (born 13 September 1979) in Ealing, London, England, is an English professional footballer who played for Barnet in the Football League.
Now he coaches soccer teams for Guildford United in Surrey, BC

External links

1979 births
Living people
People from Ealing
English footballers
Association football midfielders
Charlton Athletic F.C. players
Barnet F.C. players
St Albans City F.C. players
Farnborough F.C. players
Northwood F.C. players
King's Lynn F.C. players
Harrow Borough F.C. players
Uxbridge F.C. players
Barton Rovers F.C. players
English Football League players
Harlow Town F.C. players